Face in the Night is a 1957 British crime film directed by Lance Comfort and starring Griffith Jones, Lisa Gastoni and Vincent Ball. It was based on the novel Suspense by prolific crime writer Bruce Graeme. The film was released in the U.S. as Menace in the Night.

Plot
A young woman witnesses a mailbag robbery that ends with a dead postman, but she is intimidated into not coming forward.

Cast
 Griffith Jones ...  Rapson
 Lisa Gastoni ...  Jean Francis
 Vincent Ball ...  Bob Meredith
 Eddie Byrne ...  Art
 Victor Maddern ...  Ted
 Clifford Evans ...  Inspector Ford
 Joan Miller ...  Victor's Wife
 Leonard Sachs ...  Victor
 Leslie Dwyer ...  Toby
 Jenny Laird ...  Postman's Widow
 Angela White ...  Betty Francis
 Barbara Couper ...  Mrs. Francis
 Andre Van Gyseghem ...  Bank Manager
 Marie Burke ... Auntie

Critical reception
Allmovie wrote, "this British crime quickie reads rather better than it plays"; while TV Guide wrote that the film is "hampered by some less-than-impressive camerawork"; but Sky Movies noted "a crisp thriller, economic in length but correspondingly fast in pace and actionful."

References

External links

1957 films
1957 crime drama films
1950s thriller films
British black-and-white films
British crime drama films
British thriller films
Films based on British novels
Films directed by Lance Comfort
Films scored by Richard Rodney Bennett
Films with screenplays by Norman Hudis
1950s English-language films
1950s British films